Niko Heiskanen (born 11 March 1989 in Oulu) is a Finnish footballer who played as a defender for AC Oulu.

External links
 

1989 births
Living people
Sportspeople from Oulu
Finnish footballers
Association football defenders
AC Oulu players
21st-century Finnish people